The 2016 ICF World Junior and U23 Canoe Slalom Championships took place in Kraków, Poland from 12 to 17 July 2016 under the auspices of the International Canoe Federation (ICF) at the Kraków-Kolna Canoe Slalom Course. It was the 18th edition of the competition for Juniors (U18) and the 5th edition for the Under 23 category. No medals were awarded for the junior C2 team event and the U23 C2 team event due to low number of participating nations.

Medal summary

Men

Canoe

Junior

U23

Kayak

Junior

U23

Women

Canoe

Junior

U23

Kayak

Junior

U23

Medal table

References

External links
International Canoe Federation

ICF World Junior and U23 Canoe Slalom Championships
ICF World Junior and U23 Canoe Slalom Championships